Povratka nema (There Is No Return) is the seventh studio album by Bosnian pop singer Donna Ares. It was released 18 October 2011 through Hayat Production.

Recording
Recording sessions for the There Is No Return took place at the Allmanah studio in Sarajevo and in Donna Ares's own recording studio Sani Records in Bihać.

All but two of the album's songs were written exclusively by Donna Ares herself; the title song was co-written by her mother Ajka and "Vremena za nas" ("Time for Us") was co-written by Radovan Vujadinović, a Montenegrin teenager and amateur songwriter who contacted Ares through Facebook with the lyrics.

Singles
"Ko si ti" ("Who Are You") was the album's lead single. It was first uploaded to Ares' YouTube account 30 September 2011 and released officially on 3 October.

The title song was the official second single on 18 October 2011.

Track listing

Personnel

Instruments

Faruk Pačenković – backing vocals (6), 
Miroslav Railić Miki – accordion (4, 9), keyboards (9)
Džavid Ljubovci – guitar (4, 5, 6, 7, 8)
Hamdija Mešić – guitar (6)
Adnan Busuladžić– clarinet (4)
Jasmin Hadžisadiković – tamburica (5)
Donna Ares – piano (2, 6, 8)

Production and recording

Džavid Ljubovci – arrangement (1, 3, 4, 5, 6, 7, 8, 9, 10)

References

2011 albums
Donna Ares albums
Hayat Production albums